The  Boston Redskins season was the franchise's 4th season in the National Football League . The team finished with a record of two wins, eight losses, and one tie, and finished in fourth place in the Eastern Division of the National Football League. They failed to qualify for the playoffs for the fourth consecutive season. A road game against the Philadelphia Eagles scheduled for November 17 was canceled due to snow and rain.

Schedule

Standings

Boston Redskins seasons
Boston Redskins
1935 in sports in Massachusetts